Barbara Leonard (January 9, 1908 - July 2, 1971) was an actress in the U.S. She was in several films during the 1930s. She co-starred in Men of the North.

She reported robberies and being incapacitated during the alleged thefts. She was married to a prominent piano teacher.

Filmography
Let Not Man Put Asunder (1924) as Polly De Bohun
 Ladies of the Night Club (1928) as Dimples Revere
The Drake Case (1929) as Mrs. Drake
The Bees' Buzz (1929) as Peggy
Men of the North (1930) as Nedra Ruskin
Scotland Yard (1930 film) as Nurse Cecilia
One Romantic Night (1930) as Mitzi 
Son of the Gods (1930) as Mabel 
Bought (1931)  as Mary Kiernan
Beauty and the Boss (1932)
The Crash (1932 film) as Celeste, the maid 
One Hour with You (1932) as Mitzi's Maid  
Love Affair (1932 film) as Felice 
The Man from Yesterday (1932) as Steve's girl
Desirable (film) (1934)
Folies Bergère de Paris (1935) as Toinette
The White Angel (1936 film) as Minna
City in Darkness (1939) as Lola

References

External links 

20th-century American actresses
1908 births
1971 deaths